Brzostowo may refer to the following places in Poland:
Brzostowo, Lower Silesian Voivodeship (south-west Poland)
Brzostowo, Podlaskie Voivodeship (north-east Poland)
Brzostowo, Greater Poland Voivodeship (west-central Poland)
Brzostowo, Pyrzyce County in West Pomeranian Voivodeship (north-west Poland)
Brzostowo, Szczecinek County in West Pomeranian Voivodeship (north-west Poland)